"Ev'ry Time We Say Goodbye" is a popular jazz song with lyrics and music by Cole Porter. Part of the Great American Songbook, it was published by Chappell & Company and introduced by Nan Wynn and Jere McMahon in 1944 in Billy Rose's musical revue Seven Lively Arts.

The lyrics celebrate how happy the singer is in the company of the beloved, but suffering equally whenever the two separate. Describing it by analogy as a musical "change from major to minor", Porter begins with an A major chord and ends with an A minor one, matching the mood of the music to the words.

The Benny Goodman Quintet (vocal by Peggy Mann) enjoyed a hit record with the song in 1945.

Other notable recordings

References

Songs about parting
1944 songs
1940s jazz standards
Songs from musicals
Songs written by Cole Porter
Pop standards